The Orange County Museum of Art (OCMA) is a modern and contemporary art museum located on the campus of the Segerstrom Center for the Arts in Costa Mesa, California. The museum's collection comprises more than 4,500 objects, with a concentration on the art of California and the Pacific Rim from the early 20th century to present. Exhibits include traditional paintings, sculptures, and photography, as well as new media in the form of video, digital, and installation art.

History
The museum was founded in 1962 as the Balboa Pavilion Gallery by 13 women who rented space in the Balboa Pavilion building in order to exhibit modern and contemporary art. By 1968 the institution became known as the Newport Harbor Art Museum, and in 1972 moved to a nearby, larger location. In 1977 the museum opened its doors in Newport Beach on San Clemente Drive in Fashion Island. In 1997, the museum was remodeled and renamed the Orange County Museum of Art.

On May 31, 2018, officials unveiled the design for the museum’s new building at Segerstrom Center for the Arts in Costa Mesa created by Morphosis. The sale of the former Newport Beach site was announced on May 15, 2018. Groundbreaking for the three-story building took place in September 2019, with a projected opening in 2022. With nearly 25,000 square feet of exhibition galleries—approximately 50 percent more than in the current location—the new 52,000-square-foot museum would allow OCMA to organize major special exhibitions alongside spacious installations from its collection. It would also feature an additional 10,000 square feet for education programs, performances, and public gatherings, and include administrative offices, a gift shop, and a café. The structure was topped out on October 6, 2020.

Temporary space 
OCMA opened a temporary space at South Coast Village on October 3, 2018 which served as its interim home during the construction of the permanent Segerstrom Center facility. Known as OCMA Expand Santa Ana (stylized as OCMAEXPAND-SANTA ANA), the site featured exhibition seasons of approximately six months each in duration. The museum was temporarily closed on March 14, 2020 in accordance with quarantine efforts in response to the COVID-19 breakout in the United States. The facility was once again shuttered on November 16, 2020 amidst what local health officials described as a "second wave" of the virus in Orange County.

New museum

On October 8, 2022 OCMA opened its doors to the public for the first time with a 24-hour Grand Opening. Following from the design of Thom Mayne and Morphosis, the building features curving bands of terracotta paneling to create a distinctive visual character. Inaugural exhibitions included a return of the California Bienniel exhibition titled California Biennial 2022: Pacific Gold, Fred Eversley: Reflecting Back (the World), and 13 Women in honor of the institution's founders.

Exhibitions

Exhibition history
The Orange County Museum of Art has organized exhibitions of contemporary art, including the first surveys of Vija Celmins (1980), Chris Burden (1988), and Tony Cragg (1990), as well as major exhibitions of work by Lari Pittman (1983), Gunther Forg (1989), Charles Ray (1990), Guillermo Kuitca (1992), Bill Viola (1997), Inigo Manglano-Ovalle (2003), Catherine Opie (2006), Mary Heilmann (2007), and Jack Goldstein(2012). Thematic exhibitions of contemporary art have ranged from Objectives: The New Sculpture (1990) which presented the work of Grenville Davey, Katharina Fritsch, Robert Gober, Jeff Koons, Annette Lemieus, Juan Muñoz, Julian Opie, and Haim Steinbach; Girls’ Night Out (2003), which presented work by Eija-Liisa Ahtila, Elina Brotherus, Dorit Cypis, Rineke Dijkstra, Katy Grannan, Sarah Jones, Kelly Nipper, Daniela Rossell, Shirana Shahbazi, and Salla Tykka; and State of Mind: New California Art circa 1970, presenting an in-depth study of California artists in the 1960s and 1970s.

The museum has also organized and hosted exhibitions of modern art and design such as Edvard Munch: Expressionist Paintings, 1900-1940(1983), The Interpretive Link: Abstract Surrealism into Abstract Expressionism: Works on Paper, 1938-1948 (1986), The Figurative Fifties: New York Figurative Expressionism (1988), American Modern, 1925-1940: Design for a New Age (2001), Picasso to Pollock: Modern Masterpieces from the Wadsworth Atheneum Museum of Art (2004), Villa America: American Moderns 1900-1950 (2005), Birth of the Cool: Art, Design, and Culture at Midcentury (2007), and Illumination: The Paintings of Georgia O’Keeffe, Agnes Pelton, Agnes Martin, and Florence Miller Pierce (2009).

In 1984 the Museum launched the California Biennial, focusing on emerging artists in the state. In 2013, that program evolved into the California-Pacific Triennial, the first on-going exhibition in the Western Hemisphere devoted to contemporary art from around the Pacific Rim. The museum has co-organized exhibitions with the Renaissance Society, the Pennsylvania Academy of the Fine Arts, and the Grey Art Gallery, and its exhibitions have traveled to more than 30 museums throughout the United States and in Europe. These projects include Kutlug Ataman: Paradise (2007); Mary Heilmann: To Be Someone (2012); Jack Goldstein x 10,000 (2012); and Richard Jackson: Ain’t Painting a Pain (2013).

Collection history
The museum’s major holdings are California-based, highlighting such movements as Early and Mid-Century Modernism, Bay Area Figuration, Assemblage, California Light and Space, Pop Art, Minimalism, and Installation Art. Prominently featured are works by John Baldessari, Elmer Bischoff, Jessica Bronson, Chris Burden, Vija Celmins, Bruce Conner, Richard Diebenkorn, Robert Irwin, Helen Lundeberg, Stanton Macdonald-Wright, John McCracken, John McLaughlin, Catherine Opie, Alan Rath, Charles Ray, Edward Ruscha, and Bill Viola.

The Museum’s international holdings are a growing area of the collection, featuring work by Eija-Liisa Ahtila, Lee Bul, Katy Grannan, Joseph Grigely, Glenn Ligon, Christian Marclay, Inigo Manglano-Ovalle, Marjetica Potrc, David Reed, Daniela Rossell, and Lorna Simpson.

References

External links

Orange County, California culture
Art museums and galleries in California
Museums in Orange County, California
Buildings and structures in Newport Beach, California
Art museums established in 1962
1962 establishments in California